Owen Biddle (born October 1, 1977) is an American bass guitarist, record producer and songwriter, known for his work with hip hop group The Roots On August 25, 2011, he announced he was leaving The Roots to focus on his band, Mister Barrington. In 2020, he became a member of the band Squeeze.

Prior to joining the group, Biddle was credited with production and writing on The Roots' Grammy-nominated album, Game Theory. Other work includes multiple Grammy-winning recordings with John Legend in 2011, Booker T. Jones in 2012; also, with Al Green, Beanie Sigel, Baaba Maal, Jazmine Sullivan, Taylor Dayne, Enemy Earth, Jazzyfatnastees.

He is also a member of The Trolleyvox and was a bassist, composer and member of the Philadelphia-based rock band Pepper's Ghost.  Biddle is a member of New York City–based Mister Barrington, along with English keyboardist Oli Rockberger and drum virtuoso Zach Danziger.

As part of a recurring sketch on Late Night with Jimmy Fallon, called "The Real Housewives of Late Night", Biddle portrayed his fictional alcoholic wife.

References

External links
Owen Biddle on Myspace
"Owen Biddle bass solo at the Roseland Ballroom, NYC"
"The Roots perform the Star Spangled Banner COLBERT REPORT"
"Alternate Root: Owen Biddle's unlikely path to Late Night"
"The Roots take Manhattan", Village Voice, 25 February 2009
"Late night with The Roots as Jimmy Fallon's TV house band, Philly's globe-spanning hip-hoppers adapt to a new way to work, a new audience to wow.", Philly.com

Living people
1977 births
Owen
The Roots members
21st-century American bass guitarists